Sylvan School, also known as Pig Ankle School, Sylvan Community Building, Sylvan Sunday School and Church of the Firstborn, is a historic one-room school located at Naylor, Ripley County, Missouri, USA. It was built in 1926 and is a one-story, one room rectangular frame building. It measures 48 feet 4 inches by 38 feet 4 inches and has a hipped roof. Classes were conducted in the building until 1956.

It was added to the National Register of Historic Places in 2002.

References

One-room schoolhouses in Missouri
School buildings on the National Register of Historic Places in Missouri
School buildings completed in 1881
Buildings and structures in Ripley County, Missouri
National Register of Historic Places in Ripley County, Missouri